Vanlalthlana (born 27 October 1978) is an academician and politician from Mizoram, India. He is an assistant professor of commerce at Pachhunga University College, Mizoram University. He is the founding member of the Zoram People's Movement, a regional political party in Mizoram. He was elected to the Mizoram Legislative Assembly from Aizawl North 2 constituency in the 2018 general election as an independent candidate. (His party could not get formal registration from Election Commission of India at the time.) He defeated Lalthanliana of Mizoram People's Conference, the then sitting MLA, H. Liansailova of Indian National Congress, and Laltlanzova Khiangte of Mizo National Front.

Family
Vanlalthlana is the son of a church minister Rev. C. Biakmawia, who had served as Moderator of the Mizoram Presbyterian Church Synod and Principal of Aizawl Theological College. With his wife, Evelyn Lalhmangaihi, and three daughters, he resides at Ramhlun North, Aizawl, Mizoram.

Education
Vanlalthlana studied commerce and completed M.Com. and PhD from Mizoram University. He joined the faculty of commerce at Pachhunga University College in 2005. In 2020, the Bharatiya Chhatra Sansad (Indian Youth/Students Parliament) Foundation under the Maharashtra Institute of Technology awarded him "Ideal Youth MLA."

References

Mizoram politicians
People from Aizawl district
Living people
Mizo people
1978 births
Mizoram MLAs 2018–2023